Kamal Bahadur Shah is a Nepalese politician currently serving as the Chief Minister of Karnali Province. He is also a member of Sudurpashchim Provincial Assembly.

References 

 

21st-century Nepalese politicians
Living people
Members of the Provincial Assembly of Sudurpashchim Province
Nepalese politicians
Nepali Congress politicians from Sudurpashchim Province
People from Humla District
1965 births

Chief Ministers of Nepalese provinces
Members of the 2nd Nepalese Constituent Assembly